Concepción District is one of fifteen districts of the province Concepción in Peru.

References